Șoldanu is a commune in Călărași County, Muntenia, Romania,  away from Bucharest. It is composed of two villages: Negoești and Șoldanu.

References

Communes in Călărași County
Localities in Muntenia